Albert Dinarovich Sharipov (born 11 April 1993) is a Russian professional football player. He plays as a central midfielder for FC Pari Nizhny Novgorod.

Club career
He made his Russian Premier League debut for FC Rubin Kazan on 18 July 2015 in a game against PFC CSKA Moscow.

Personal life
His father Dinar Sharipov played in the Russian Premier League for FC Krylia Sovetov Samara.

Career statistics

External links
 
 
 

1993 births
Footballers from Ufa
Living people
Russian footballers
Russia under-21 international footballers
Association football midfielders
FC Kuban Krasnodar players
FC Tyumen players
FC Fakel Voronezh players
FC Tom Tomsk players
FC Rubin Kazan players
FC Neftekhimik Nizhnekamsk players
FC Rotor Volgograd players
FC Nizhny Novgorod (2015) players
Russian Premier League players
Russian First League players
Russian Second League players